The 1981 Donnay Indoor Championships was a men's tennis tournament played on indoor carpet courts in Brussels, Belgium. It was a WCT tournament that was part of the 1981 Volvo Grand Prix circuit. It was the inaugural edition of the tournament and was held from 9 March until 15 March 1981. Second-seeded Jimmy Connors won the singles title.

Finals

Singles

 Jimmy Connors defeated   Brian Gottfried, 6–2, 6–4, 6–3 
 It was Connors' 2nd singles title of the year and the 87th of his career.

Doubles

 Sandy Mayer /  Frew McMillan defeated  Kevin Curren /  Steve Denton, 4–6, 6–3, 6–3

References

Donnay Indoor Championships
Donnay
+
March 1981 sports events in Europe